Information-based complexity (IBC) studies optimal algorithms and computational complexity for the continuous problems that arise in physical science, economics, engineering, and mathematical finance. IBC has studied such continuous problems as path integration, partial differential equations, systems of ordinary differential equations, nonlinear equations, integral equations, fixed points, and very-high-dimensional integration. All these problems involve functions (typically multivariate) of a real or complex variable. Since one can never obtain a closed-form solution to the problems of interest one has to settle for a numerical solution. Since a function of a real or complex variable cannot be entered into a digital computer, the solution of continuous problems involves partial information. To give a simple illustration, in the numerical approximation of an integral, only samples of the integrand at a finite number of points are available. In the numerical solution of partial differential equations the functions specifying the boundary conditions and the coefficients of the differential operator can only be sampled. Furthermore, this partial information can be expensive to obtain. Finally the information is often contaminated by noise.

The goal of information-based complexity is to create a theory of computational complexity and optimal algorithms for problems with partial, contaminated and priced information, and to apply the results to answering questions in various disciplines. Examples of such disciplines include physics, economics, mathematical finance, computer vision, control theory, geophysics, medical imaging, weather forecasting and climate prediction, and statistics. The theory is developed over abstract spaces, typically Hilbert or Banach spaces, while the applications are usually for multivariate problems.

Since the information is partial and contaminated, only approximate solutions can be obtained. IBC studies computational complexity and optimal algorithms for approximate solutions in various settings. Since the worst case setting often leads to negative results such as unsolvability and intractability, settings with weaker assurances such as average, probabilistic and randomized are also studied. A fairly new area of IBC research is continuous quantum computing.

Overview
We illustrate some important concepts with a very simple example, the computation of

For most integrands we can't use the fundamental theorem of calculus to compute the integral analytically; we have to approximate it numerically.

The n numbers are the partial information about the true integrand  We combine these n numbers by a combinatory algorithm to compute an approximation to the integral. See the monograph Complexity and Information for particulars.

Because we have only partial information we can use an adversary argument to tell us how large n has to be to compute an -approximation. Because of these information-based arguments we can often obtain tight bounds on the complexity of continuous problems. For discrete problems such as integer factorization or the travelling salesman problem we have to settle for conjectures about the complexity hierarchy. The reason is that the input is a number or a vector of numbers and can thus be entered into the computer. Thus there is typically no adversary argument at the information level and the complexity of a discrete problem is rarely known.

The univariate integration problem was for illustration only. Significant for many applications is multivariate integration. The number of variables is in the hundreds or thousands. The number of variables may even be infinite; we then speak of path integration. The reason that integrals are important in many disciplines is that they occur when we want to know the expected behavior of a continuous process. See for example, the application to mathematical finance below.

Assume we want to compute an integral in d dimensions (dimensions and variables are used interchangeably) and that we want to guarantee an error at most  for any integrand in some class. The computational complexity of the problem is known to be of order  (Here we are counting the number of function evaluations and the number of arithmetic operations so this is the time complexity.) This would take many years for even modest values of  The exponential dependence on d is called the curse of dimensionality. We say the problem is intractable.

We stated the curse of dimensionality for integration. But exponential dependence on d occurs for almost every continuous problem that has been investigated. How can we try to vanquish the curse? There are two possibilities:

Another possibility is the randomized setting. For some problems we can break the curse of dimensionality by weakening the assurance; for others, we cannot. There is a large IBC literature on results in various settings; see Where to Learn More below.
 We can incorporate domain knowledge. See An Example: Mathematical Finance below.

An example: mathematical finance
Very high dimensional integrals are common in finance. For example, computing expected cash flows for a collateralized mortgage obligation (CMO) requires the calculation of a number of  dimensional integrals, the  being the number of months in  years. Recall that if a worst case assurance is required the time is of order  time units. Even if the error is not small, say  this is  time units. People in finance have long been using the Monte Carlo method (MC), an instance of a randomized algorithm. Then in 1994 a research group at Columbia University (Papageorgiou, Paskov, Traub, Woźniakowski) discovered that the quasi-Monte Carlo (QMC) method using low discrepancy sequences beat MC by one to three orders of magnitude. The results were reported to a number of Wall Street finance to considerable initial skepticism. The results were first published by Paskov and Traub, Faster Valuation of Financial Derivatives, Journal of Portfolio Management 22, 113-120. Today QMC is widely used in the financial sector to value financial derivatives.

These results are empirical; where does computational complexity come in? QMC is not a panacea for all high dimensional integrals. What is special about financial derivatives? Here's a possible explanation. The  dimensions in the CMO represent monthly future times. Due to the discounted value of money variables representing times for in the future are less important than the variables representing nearby times. Thus the integrals are non-isotropic. Sloan and Woźniakowski introduced the very powerful idea of weighted spaces, which is a formalization of the above observation. They were able to show that with this additional domain knowledge high dimensional integrals satisfying certain conditions were tractable even in the worst case! In contrast the Monte Carlo method gives only a stochastic assurance. See Sloan and Woźniakowski When are Quasi-Monte Carlo Algorithms Efficient for High Dimensional Integration? J. Complexity 14, 1-33, 1998. For which classes of integrals is QMC superior to MC? This continues to be a major research problem.

Brief history
Precursors to IBC may be found in the 1950s by Kiefer, Sard, and Nikolskij. In 1959 Traub had the key insight that the optimal algorithm and the computational complexity of solving a continuous problem depended on the available information. He applied this insight to the solution of nonlinear equations, which started the area of optimal iteration theory. This research was published in the 1964 monograph Iterative Methods for the Solution of Equations.

The general setting for information-based complexity was formulated by Traub and Woźniakowski in 1980 in A General Theory of Optimal Algorithms. For a list of more recent monographs and pointers to the extensive literature see To Learn More below.

Prizes
There are a number of prizes for IBC research.

Prize for Achievement in Information-Based Complexity This annual prize, which was created in 1999, consists of $3000 and a plaque. It is given for outstanding achievement in information-based complexity. The recipients are listed below. The affiliation is as of the time of the award.
 1999 Erich Novak, University of Jena, Germany
 2000 Sergei Pereverzev, Ukrainian Academy of Science, Ukraine
 2001 G. W. Wasilkowski, University of Kentucky, USA
 2002 Stefan Heinrich, University of Kaiserslautern, Germany
 2003 Arthur G. Werschulz, Fordham University, USA
 2004 Peter Mathe, Weierstrass Institute for Applied Analysis and Stochastics, Germany
 2005 Ian Sloan, Scientia Professor, University of New South Wales, Sydney, Australia
 2006 Leszek Plaskota, Department of Mathematics, Informatics and Mechanics, University of Warsaw, Poland
 2007 Klaus Ritter, Department of Mathematics, TU Darmstadt, Germany
 2008 Anargyros Papageorgiou, Columbia University, USA
 2009 Thomas Mueller-Gronbach, Fakultaet fuer Informatik und Mathematik, Universitaet Passau, Germany
 2010 Boleslaw Z. Kacewicz, Department of Mathematics, AGH University of Science and Technology, Cracow, Poland
 2011 Aicke Hinrichs, Fakultät für Mathematik und Informatik, FSU Jena, Germany
 2012 Michael Gnewuch, Department of Computer Science, Christian-Albrechts-Universitaet zu Kiel, Germany and School of Mathematics and Statistics, University of New South Wales, Sydney, Australia
 2012 (Special prize) Krzysztof Sikorski, Department of Computer Science, University of Utah
 2013 Co-winners
 Josef Dick, University of New South Wales, Sydney, Australia
 Friedrich Pillichshammer, Johannes Kepler University, Linz, Austria
 2014 Frances Kuo, School of Mathematics, University of New South Wales, Sydney, Australia
 2015 Peter Kritzer, Department of Financial Mathematics, University of Linz, Austria
 2016 Fred J. Hickernell, Department of Applied Mathematics, Illinois Institute of Technology, Chicago, USA
 2017 Co-winners
 Thomas Kühn, University of Leipzig, Germany
 Winfried Sickel, University of Jena, Germany.
 2018 Paweł Przybyłowicz, AGH University of Science and Technology in Kraków, Poland
 2019 Jan Vybíral, Czech Technical University, Prague, Czech Republic
Information-Based Complexity Young Researcher Award This annual award, which created in 2003, consists of $1000 and a plaque. The recipients have been
 2003 Frances Kuo, School of Mathematics, University of New South Wales, Sydney, Australia
 2004 Christiane Lemieux, University of Calgary, Calgary, Alberta, Canada, and Josef Dick, University of New South Wales, Sydney, Australia
 2005 Friedrich Pillichshammer, Institute for Financial Mathematics, University of Linz, Austria
 2006 Jakob Creutzig, TU Darmstadt, Germany and Dirk Nuyens, Katholieke Universiteit, Leuven, Belgium
 2007 Andreas Neuenkirch, Universität Frankfurt, Germany
 2008 Jan Vybíral, University of Jena, Germany
 2009 Steffen Dereich, TU Berlin, Germany
 2010 Daniel Rudolf, University of Jena, Germany
 2011 Peter Kritzer, University of Linz, Austria
 2012 Pawel Przybylowicz, AGH University of Science and Technology, Cracow, Poland
 2013 Christoph Aistleitner, Department of Analysis and Computational Number Theory, Technische Universitat Graz, Austria
 2014 Tino Ullrich, Institute for Numerical Simulation, University of Bonn, Germany
 2015 Mario Ullrich, Institute of Analysis, Johannes Kepler University Linz, Austria
 2016 Mario Hefter, TU Kaiserslautern, Germany
 2017 Co-winners
 Takashi Goda, University of Tokyo
 Larisa Yaroslavtseva, University of Passau
 2018 Arnulf Jentzen, Eidgenössische Technische Hochschule (ETH) Zürich, Switzerland
Best Paper Award, Journal of Complexity This annual award, which was created in 1996, consists of $3000 ($4000 since 2015) and a plaque. Many, but by no means all of the awards have been for research in IBC. The recipients have been
 1996 Pascal Koiran
 1997 Co-winners
B. Bank, M. Giusti, J. Heintz, and G. M. Mbakop
R. DeVore and V. Temlyakov
 1998 Co-winners
Stefan Heinrich
P. Kirrinis
 1999 Arthur G. Werschulz
 2000 Co-winners
Bernard Mourrain and Victor Y. Pan
J. Maurice Rojas
 2001 Erich Novak
 2002 Peter Hertling
 2003 Co-winners
Markus Blaeser
Boleslaw Kacewicz
 2004 Stefan Heinrich
 2005 Co-winners
Yosef Yomdin
Josef Dick and Friedrich Pillichshammer
 2006 Knut Petras and Klaus Ritter
 2007 Co-winners
Martin Avendano, Teresa Krick and Martin Sombra
Istvan Berkes, Robert F. Tichy and the late Walter Philipp
 2008 Stefan Heinrich and Bernhard Milla
 2009 Frank Aurzada, Steffen Dereich, Michael Scheutzow and Christian Vormoor
 2010 Co-winners
 Aicke Hinrichs
 Simon Foucart, Alain Pajor, Holger Rauhut, Tino Ullrich
 2011 Co-winners
 Thomas Daun
 Leszek Plaskota, Greg W. Wasilkowski
 2012 Co-winners
 Dmitriy Bilyk, V.N. Temlyakov, Rui Yu
 Lutz Kämmerer, Stefan Kunis, Daniel Potts
 2013 Co-winners
 Shu Tezuka
 Joos Heintz, Bart Kuijpers, Andrés Rojas Paredes
 2014 Bernd Carl, Aicke Hinrichs, Philipp Rudolph
 2015 Thomas Müller-Gronbach, Klaus Ritter, Larisa Yaroslavtseva
 2016 Co-winners
 David Harvey, Joris van der Hoeven and Grégoire Lecerf
 Carlos Beltrán, Jordi Marzo and Joaquim Ortega-Cerdà
 2017 Martijn Baartse and Klaus Meer
 2018 Co-winners
 Stefan Heinrich
 Julian Grote and Christoph Thäle
 2019 Winners
 Aicke Hinrichs, Mario Ullrich

References
Traub, J. F., Iterative Methods for the Solution of Equations, Prentice Hall, 1964. Reissued Chelsea Publishing Company, 1982; Russian translation MIR, 1985; Reissued American Mathematical Society, 1998
Traub, J. F., and Woźniakowski, H., A General Theory of Optimal Algorithms, Academic Press, New York, 1980
Traub, J. F., Woźniakowski, H., and Wasilkowski, G. W., Information, Uncertainty, Complexity, Addison-Wesley, New York, 1983
Novak, E., Deterministic and Stochastic Error Bounds in Numerical Analysis, Lecture Notes in Mathematics, vol. 1349, Springer-Verlag, New  York, 1988

Werschulz, A. G., The Computational Complexity of Differential and Integral Equations: An Information-Based Approach, Oxford University Press, New York, 1991
Kowalski, M., Sikorski, K., and Stenger, F., Selected Topics in Approximation and Computation, Oxford University Press, Oxford, UK, 1995
Plaskota, L., Noisy Information and Computational Complexity, Cambridge University Press, Cambridge, UK, 1996
Traub, J. F., and Werschulz, A. G., Complexity and Information, Oxford University Press, Oxford, UK, 1998
Ritter, K., Average-Case Analysis of Numerical Problems, Springer-Verlag, New York, 2000
Sikorski, K., Optimal Solution of Nonlinear Equations, Oxford University Press, Oxford, UK, 2001

Extensive bibliographies may be found in the monographs N (1988), TW (1980), TWW (1988) and TW (1998).
The IBC website has a searchable data base of some 730 items.

External links
Journal of Complexity
Complexity and Information
Joseph Traub
J.F Traub, 1985. An Introduction to Information-Based Complexity

Computational complexity theory